Pyotr Sergeevich Velyaminov (1926–2009) was a Soviet Russian film and theater actor who was awarded the title People's Artist of the RSFSR. Commander of Order "For Merit to the Fatherland" 3rd class.

Life 
His father, Sergey Petrovich Velyaminov (1898-1976), was from a hereditary military and ancient noble family, known from the 11th century. His mother was Tatiana Ermilovna (1893–1972).

Pyotr Velyaminov was arrested at the age of sixteen in 1943 charged with anti-communist activities and sentenced to a Gulag camp. He spent nine years at prison. Here he joined an amateur theatrical group. After his release in 1953 he began performing in the Abakan Drama Theatre.

He received the award People's Artist of the RSFSR in 1985 and also People's Artist of the Chuvash Republic.

He had three children, including a son Sergei Velyaminov (born February 5, 1964), who became an actor like his father. He  was married to the daughter of popular Soviet actor Georgy Burkov.

He was buried June 17, 2009 at Literatorskiye Jetty of Volkovo Cemetery in St. Petersburg.

Selected filmography 
 Commander of the Lucky 'Pike' (1972) as  Aleksei Strogov 
 Eternal Call (1973–1983)  as  Polycarp   Kruzhilin 
 Sweet Woman (1977)  as  Nikolai Kushakov 
 Pirates of the 20th Century (1979)  as  Ivan Ilych, Soviet Captain
 Night Accident (1980) as Mitin
 Bandit Petersburg (2000) as Yegor

References

External links 
 
 Pyotr Velyaminov bio at Lifeactor.ru 
 Velyaminov Novikov Online Actors of Soviet and Russian cinema
 Our cinema - Pyotr Velyaminov
 Pyotr Velyamnov to RIA Novosti
 Pyotr Velyaminov on zwezda.ru

1926 births
2009 deaths
Russian male film actors
Russian male stage actors
Soviet male film actors
Soviet male stage actors
People's Artists of the RSFSR
Male actors from Moscow
20th-century Russian male actors
21st-century Russian male actors
Gulag detainees
Recipients of the Order "For Merit to the Fatherland", 3rd class
Recipients of the USSR State Prize
Recipients of the Order "For Merit to the Fatherland", 4th class